Crush and Blush (lit. "Miss Hongdangmu" or "Miss Carrot") is a 2008 South Korean film. It is the feature film debut of director Lee Kyoung-mi, and also the first film to be produced by Park Chan-wook.

Crush and Blush premiered at the 13th Pusan International Film Festival, and went on general release in South Korea on October 16, 2010.

Plot 
Yang Mi-sook is an unpopular and frumpy high school Russian teacher who has a habit of going red in the face. For ten years she has been harbouring a crush on Seo Jong-cheol, her former teacher and now married colleague, though he is more interested in pretty new teacher Lee Yoo-ri. Mi-sook tries to put a halt to this blossoming romance, forming an unlikely alliance with Jong-cheol's daughter, Jong-hee.

Cast 
 Gong Hyo-jin as Yang Mi-sook
 Seo Woo as Seo Jong-hee
 Lee Jong-hyuk as Seo Jong-cheol
 Hwang Woo-seul-hye as Lee Yoo-ri
 Bang Eun-jin as Seong Eun-gyo
 Bong Joon-ho as teacher (cameo)

Awards and nominations

Release 
Crush and Blush made its world premiere at the 13th Pusan International Film Festival, which ran from October 2–10, 2008.

References

External links 
  
 
 
 

2008 films
2000s Korean-language films
2008 romantic comedy films
Films about educators
South Korean sex comedy films
South Korean romantic comedy films
2008 directorial debut films
2000s South Korean films